Hays Paddock is a popular Australian recreational park in the eastern Melbourne suburb of Kew East. Managed by City of Boroondara council, the park consists of a popular playground, walking & cycling tracks, and two ovals for teams playing Archery, Cricket, and Soccer. The park is also sometimes referred to as 'Kilby Park' due to its proximity to Kilby Road, and 'Glass Creek' due to the creek of the same name that passes through.

Sport

History
The creek of Glass Creek passes through the parkland, entering from the south-east corner of the park and exiting through the central west-end underneath the Eastern Freeway. The land originally belonging to the Wurundjeri people, William Oswin was the first recorded owner of the land in 1844 where Hays Paddock and Glass Creek flows into the Yarra on a property known as Kilby Farm.

References

External links

Parks in Melbourne
1844 establishments in Australia
City of Boroondara